Edward Ludlow "Eddie" Hall (March 17, 1872 – 1932) was an American tennis player who was active at the end of the 19th century. He was the son of Valentine Hall Jr. and an uncle of First Lady Eleanor Roosevelt.

Career
In 1892 he reached the men's doubles final at the U.S. National Championships together with his elder brother Valentine Gill Hall III (1867—1934). They lost the final, played at the Philadelphia Cricket Club, to Oliver Campbell and Bob Huntington in four sets. Hall reached the semifinals in the singles and the quarterfinals the year before.

Together with his brother he won the National Eastern Doubles Championships in 1892. In July 1892 Eddie defeated his brother Valentine in the final of the Southampton tournament in New York. In August 1892 Hall won the Nahant tournament with eight victories and one defeat. Eddie won the Southern Championships in 1891, 1892, and 1893, and the Montclair Open in 1890.

Grand Slam finals

Doubles (1 runner-up)

References

1872 births
1932 deaths
American male tennis players
Livingston family
Date of death missing
Tennis people from New York (state)